Laurel House, is an American author, TV personality and international dating coach with a no-games approach to dating. House is a monthly guest of KTLA hosting segments for their morning news program and appears as a dating expert on Nightline, The Today Show, E! News, and Good Morning America. In 2016, House was a dating coach on the E! Network original series, Famously Single with a cast of celebrities including: Brandi Glanville, the Bachelorette's Josh Murray, Pauly D, Love & Hip Hop's Somaya Reece, Aubrey O'Day, Jessica White, Willis McGahee and Calum Best.

Writing 

Contributing Writer
House is a contributing writer to media sources including: Reader's Digest, Thrillist, Self, AskMen.com, YourTango.com, Shape, The Minds Journal. and Glamour Magazine, where she writes on a variety of topics related to dating and relationships. House is an expert on flirting and has been called the ‘Man Whisperer’.

QuickieChick's Cheat Sheet to Life, Love, Food, Fitness, Fashion and Finance—on a Less-Than-Fabulous Budget (St, Martin's Press, 2012)
In this book, House compiles lifestyle tips, cheat-sheets and quizzes.

Screwing the Rules The No-Games Guide to Love (Running Press, 2014)
In this book, House writes about the games and strategies associated with dating. In the book, House uses her own experiences following the classic dating rules to show that ignoring them is a better approach.

Personal life 
Laurel House has been married three times and twice divorced. She has one child from a previous relationship.

TV Personality 
House has been a guest host on various networks as a dating expert. She is a monthly guest of KTLA for their morning news program, including three large features filmed in 2016. Additionally, she is a recurring featured expert on Nightline and has appeared on The Today Show, E! News, and Good Morning America.

Love Bites on FYI 
In 2015, House co-hosted a dating game show entitled Love Bites that aired on the FYI Network helping daters on blind dinner dates.

Famously Single on E! 

In 2016, she was a dating coach on the E! Network original series, Famously Single with a cast of celebrities including: Brandi Glanville, the Bachelorette's Josh Murray, Pauly D, Love & Hip Hop's Somaya Reece, Aubrey O'Day, Jessica White, Willis McGahee and Calum Best.

Dating Coaching 
Since 2010, House has worked with clients around the world with one-on-one dating consulting.

Additionally, House co-hosted The Great Love Debate on PodcastOne.

References

External links 
 LaurelHouse.com
 KTLA's Top 5 Dating Mistakes with Laurel House

Year of birth missing (living people)
Living people
21st-century American writers
21st-century American women writers
American television personalities
American women television personalities